Andrija Radulović may refer to:
 Andrija Radulović (poet)
 Andrija Radulović (footballer)